Paul Stevens Otellini (October 12, 1950 – October 2, 2017) was an American businessman and one-time president and CEO of Intel. He was also on the board of directors of Google.

Early life and education  
Paul S. Otellini was born and raised in San Francisco, California, United States. His family is of Italian origin. Otellini graduated from St. Ignatius College Preparatory and held a bachelor's degree in economics from the University of San Francisco earned in 1972. He received an MBA from the Haas School of Business at the University of California, Berkeley in 1974.

Employment at Intel
Otellini joined Intel in 1974. From 1998 to 2002, he was executive vice president and general manager of the Intel Architecture Group, responsible for the company's microprocessor and chipset businesses and strategies for desktop, mobile and enterprise computing. From 1996 to 1998, Otellini served as executive vice president of sales and marketing and from 1994 to 1996 as senior vice president and general manager of sales and marketing.

Previously, he served as general manager of the Microprocessor Products Group, leading the introduction of the Pentium microprocessor that followed in 1993. He also managed Intel's business with IBM, served as general manager of both the Peripheral Components Operation and the Folsom Microcomputer Division, where he was responsible for the company's chipset operations, and served as a technical assistant to then-Intel president Andrew Grove.

Otellini was appointed an operating group vice president in 1988, elected as an Intel corporate officer in 1991, made senior vice president in 1993, and promoted to executive vice president in 1996.

In 2002, he was elected to the board of directors and became president and Chief Operating Officer at the company.

On May 18, 2005 he replaced Craig Barrett as the new CEO of Intel. Otellini was considered a departure from the norm when he was promoted to CEO because he was not an engineer. Otellini is reported to have been a major force in convincing Apple Inc. in the Apple-to-Intel transition, and being very fond of Mac OS X, saying Microsoft's Windows Vista is "closer to the Mac than we've been on the Windows side for a long time".

In 2006, he oversaw the largest round of layoffs in Intel history when 10,500 (or 10% of the corporate workforce) employees were laid-off. Job cuts in manufacturing, product design, and other redundancies, were made in an effort to save $3 billion/year in cost by 2008. Of the 10,500 jobs, 1,000 layoffs were at the management level. In 2006, Otellini was named Haas Business Leader of the Year.

In 2007, Otellini announced plans to build a $3 billion semiconductor manufacturing plant in the port city of Dalian, China.

On November 19, 2012, Otellini announced his intention to retire in May 2013. On May 2, 2013, Brian Krzanich was named the new CEO of Intel.

Personal life
Otellini was a member in the Professional Business Fraternity Delta Sigma Pi; he joined while attending the University of San Francisco.

Otellini died in his sleep on October 2, 2017 at his home in Sonoma County, California. He was survived by his second wife, of 30 years, Sandy Otellini; his son, Patrick; and his daughter, Alexis.

Otellini's brother, Rev. Msgr. Steven Otellini, is a Roman Catholic priest in the Archdiocese of San Francisco, currently serving as pastor of The Church of the Nativity in Menlo Park, California, United States.

References

External links

Intel website biography
Otellini talking about innovation.

1950 births
2017 deaths
American technology chief executives
American computer businesspeople
American corporate directors
American people of Italian descent
Businesspeople from California
Businesspeople in software
Directors of Google
Haas School of Business alumni
Intel people
University of San Francisco alumni
American chief operating officers
American chief executives of manufacturing companies
20th-century American businesspeople